Kesong puti is a Filipino soft, unaged, white cheese made from unskimmed carabao milk and salt curdled with vinegar, citrus juices, or sometimes rennet. It can also be made with goat or cow milk. It has a mild salty and tart flavor. When an acidifying agent is used, it resembles queso blanco or paneer. When rennet is used, it resembles buffalo mozzarella. Moisture content can also vary, ranging from almost gelatinous to pressed and firm. It can be eaten as is, paired with bread (usually pandesal), or used in various dishes in Filipino cuisine. It is usually sold wrapped in banana leaves.

The name, also spelled quesong puti, is Tagalog for "white cheese" and is its name in the provinces of Laguna and Bulacan. In Cavite it is known as kesilyo (also kasilyo or quesillo); while in northern Cebu it is known as queseo or kiseyo.

Etymology
Kesong puti is from Spanish queso ("cheese") with the Tagalog enclitic suffix -ng, and Tagalog puti ("white"). In other parts of the Philippines, Caviteño kesilyo or kasilyo and Cebuano queseo or kiseyo, are all nativized spellings of Spanish quesillo ("little cheese").

Production

Most kesong puti is made by direct acidification, similar to numerous other cheeses like queso blanco, paneer, ricotta, mascarpone. It is usually made with carabao milk, but it can also use goat or cow milk, though the latter has lower yields.

The most common way of making homemade kesong puti is by heating (but not boiling) fresh strained carabao milk with one to four teaspoons of salt for about ten to fifteen minutes while stirring constantly. Higher temperatures will denature the proteins, resulting in slower or even no curdling. This also pasteurizes the milk, destroying pathogens and allowing the cheese to last longer. Around a fourth of a cup of vinegar or citrus juices (or both) are then added to induce coagulation. It is left to curdle for around 30 minutes to an hour. The curds are strained with a cheesecloth (katsa) leaving the soft gelatinous-like version of kesong puti. It can be further pressed and molded to squeeze out more whey if desired. In commercial versions, the salt is usually added after the curdling either through manual mixing or by soaking the cheese in weak brine solutions.

An alternate way of making kesong puti is with rennet dissolved in a small amount of water. The rennet can either be vegetable-based or from ruminant stomachs. This is because rennet is deactivated at higher temperatures, while lower temperatures result in slow or no coagulation. Like in the previous method, it is left to coagulate for 30 minutes to an hour. The curds are strained then cut into small cubes and left to stand for another 15 minutes to allow more moisture to seep out. This method results in more curds and a firmer type of cheese once pressed. It is the method used by the Philippine Carabao Center kesong puti.

Kesong puti made with rennet is similar to the Italian mozzarella di bufala. It lacks the sour vinegary smell that usually characterizes the vinegar or citrus versions.

Culinary uses

Kesong puti is usually sold wrapped in banana leaves. It has a mildly salty and tart flavor and ideally has little or no odor. It can be eaten as is, either fresh or grilled on a pan. It is also commonly eaten with bread or kakanin rice cakes, including pandesal, puto, and bibingka, It can also be used in various dishes in Filipino cuisine;  including dishes like paella negra and ginataang pakô.

Kesong puti has a shelf life of only around a week. It depends on the amount of salt used as well as the consistency of the cheese. Softer cheese spoil faster than firmer versions. It can be extended to about two weeks to a month if packaged correctly and refrigerated. However, it should never be frozen as it will form ice crystals that damage the smooth texture.

Variants
There are four main regions producing variants of kesong puti that probably originated independently: Laguna, Cebu, Cavite, and Bulacan. The following are the most prevalent production techniques for commercial kesong puti among the regions:

Laguna
Laguna kesong puti or quesong puti is originally from Santa Cruz, Laguna. Its production is centered in the towns of Santa Cruz, Pagsanjan, and Lumban, with the milk used coming from neighboring towns (mostly from Lumban and Jalajala). Laguna kesong puti traditionally use rennet from carabao or cow abomasum. It undergoes lactic acid fermentation during the process. The salt is added afterwards and mixed by hand until the texture becomes smooth. It is similar to the Cebu version and is firmer than the Cavite and Bulacan version. Santa Cruz celebrates an annual Kesong Puti Festival.

Cebu

Cebuano queseo or kiseyo production is centered on the town of Compostela and the city of Danao. It is very similar to the Laguna version and is made using the same processes. It differs only in that queseo typically use more salt and the molds are lined with muslin cloth. The muslin cloth may be pressed with a weight. It is a fermented cheese and is also usually firm, like the Laguna version. The town of Compostela celebrates an annual Queseo Festival.

Cavite
Caviteño quesillo, kesilyo, or kasilyo production is centered in the cities of General Trias and Cavite, and the municipality of Tanza. It uses vinegar as the coagulant. It is not a fermented cheese, unlike the Laguna and Cebu versions. Salt is added to the milk beforehand. The curds are strained and molded in small cups and then further soaked in a weak brine solution. The resulting cheese has a softer consistency in comparison to the Laguna and Cebu versions.

Bulacan
Bulacan kesong puti production is centered in the towns of Santa Maria, Meycauayan, and San Miguel. It is similar to the Caviteño version in that it is not a fermented cheese and primarily use vinegar. It differs in that more vinegar is used and it is not heated while curdling. The curds are molded and then soaked in a weak brine solution.

See also
Tibok-tibok
Pastillas

List of cheeses
 List of water buffalo cheeses

References

Water buffalo's-milk cheeses
Philippine cuisine